Sphodromantis belachowski, common name African mantis or African praying mantis, is a species of praying mantis from Africa.

See also
African mantis
List of mantis genera and species

References

B
Mantodea of Africa